David Dada (born 20 November 1993) is a South Sudanese footballer who currently plays as a defender for the South Sudanese team Al-Malakia FC and South Sudan's national team.

Career

International
Dada made his first senior international appearance in a friendly in and against Botswana on 5 March 2014, having played the entire match.

References

External links
 
 

1993 births
Living people
South Sudan international footballers
South Sudanese footballers
Association football defenders